is a Japanese light novel series written by Masayuki Abe and illustrated by Ryūta Fuse. It was serialized online between May 2012 and 2013 on the user-generated novel publishing website Shōsetsuka ni Narō. It was later acquired by AlphaPolis, who have published ten volumes between April 2013 and July 2018. A manga adaptation with art by Jun Miura has been serialized online via AlphaPolis' manga website since February 2014 and has been collected in ten tankōbon volumes. The manga is published digitally in English through Alpha Manga. An anime television series adaptation by Sotsu, Makaria and Yokohama Animation Laboratory is scheduled to premiere in July 2023.

Characters

Media

Light novels

Manga

Anime
An anime television series adaptation was announced on October 19, 2022. The series is animated by Sotsu, Makaria and Yokohama Animation Laboratory and directed by Norikazu Ishigooka, with Kenta Ihara handling series' composition, Nilitsu drafting the original animation character designs, Atsushi Asahi designing the characters, and Shachō of Soil & "Pimp" Sessions and Hironori Anazawa composing the series' music. It will premiere in July 2023.

See also
 New Game Plus, which is "" in Japanese. 
 Is It Wrong to Try to Pick Up Girls in a Dungeon?: Familia Chronicle and The Executioner and Her Way of Life, light novel series illustrated by Nilitsu

References

External links
  
  
  
  
 

2023 anime television series debuts
2013 Japanese novels
Anime and manga based on light novels
Fantasy anime and manga
Isekai anime and manga
Isekai novels and light novels
Japanese webcomics
Light novels
Light novels first published online
Shōnen manga
Shōsetsuka ni Narō
Upcoming anime television series
Webcomics in print
Yokohama Animation Laboratory